The Earl Burns Miller Japanese Garden is a Japanese garden encompassing  on the campus of California State University, Long Beach, in Long Beach, California, United States. It was dedicated in 1981. Ed Lovell, landscape master plan architect for the University, traveled to Japan and took inspiration from the Imperial Gardens in Tokyo before designing the garden.  Among the annual events held at the Japanese garden is a Koi auction and a chrysanthemum show.

It is adjacent to the village site of Puvunga. In the trenching for the garden, evidence of the ancient Tongva village was uncovered in the early 1970s.

The garden is closed on Saturdays (when it is often rented out for weddings and receptions) and Mondays.

See also
 List of botanical gardens in the United States

References

External links
 Official web site

California State University, Long Beach
Landmarks in Los Angeles
Tourist attractions in Long Beach, California
Japanese gardens in California
Parks in Los Angeles County, California